LGBT Foundation  may refer to:

LGBT Foundation (UK)
LGBT Foundation (Global)